The men's 500 m time trial at the 2002 Commonwealth Games, was part of the cycling programme, which took place on 28 July 2002.

Records
Prior to this competition, the existing world record was as follows:

Results

References

Men's 1 km time trial
Cycling at the Commonwealth Games – Men's 1 km time trial